The English progressive rock band Yes has toured for five decades.

The band played live from its creation in Summer 1968. Their first overseas shows were in Belgium and the Netherlands in June 1969. They played regularly through December 1980, with the band splitting up early the next year. The band reformed in 1983, and regular tours resumed in 1984 and continued over the next few decades. The longest break in touring came from late 2004 through late 2008. Touring has tended to focus on the UK and the rest of Europe, The United States, Canada and Japan, but the band have also played other parts of the world, notably Australia.

Drama Tour

Lineup:

 Geoff Downes – keyboards
 Trevor Horn – vocals, additional guitar and percussion
 Steve Howe – guitars, vocals
 Chris Squire – bass, vocals
 Alan White – drums

Setlist:

 "Does it Really Happen?" (Squire, Howe, White, Trevor Horn, Geoff Downes)
 "Yours Is No Disgrace" (Anderson, Squire, Howe, Kaye, Bruford)
 "Into the Lens" (Squire, Howe, White, Horn, Downes)
 "Clap" (Howe)
 "And You and I" (Anderson, Squire, Howe, Bruford)
 "Go Through This" (Squire, Howe, White, Horn, Downes)
 "Man in a White Car Suite" (Squire, Howe, White, Horn, Downes)
 "We Can Fly from Here" (Horn, Downes, Squire)
 "Tempus Fugit" (Squire, Howe, White, Horn, Downes)
 "Amazing Grace/The Fish (Schindleria Praematurus)" (Traditional, arr. Squire/Squire)
 "Machine Messiah" (Squire, Howe, White, Horn, Downes)
 "Starship Trooper" (Anderson, Squire, Howe)
 "Roundabout" (Anderson, Howe)
Also occasionally played were:
 "Parallels" (Squire) (29, 30 August 1980, 1, 4, 5, 8, 9, 10, 12, 13, 14, 22, 25, 26, 27 September 1980, 2 October 1980, 16 November 1980) 
 "Surface Tension" (Steve Howe solo acoustic guitar piece) (Played on 17 October 1980)
 "Video Killed the Radio Star" (Horn, Downes, Bruce Woolley) (originally by The Buggles in 1979) (Played on 6 October and 24 November 1980, short passage 29 August 1980)
 "Run Through the Light" (Played on 16 October 1980)
 "The Fish (Schindleria Praematurus)" (Played on 5 September 1980, 16 October 1980)

Tour dates

9012Live Tour

Lineup:

 Jon Anderson – Vocals, additional keyboard and percussion
 Tony Kaye – Keyboards, vocals
 Trevor Rabin – Guitars, vocals
 Chris Squire – Bass, vocals
 Alan White – Drums, percussion, vocals

and

 Casey Young – Additional keyboards (offstage)

Setlist:

 "Cinema" (Trevor Rabin, Kaye, Squire, White)
 "Leave It" (Rabin, Horn, Squire)
 "Our Song" (dropped between 4 March 1984 and 9 August 1984, dropped after 1 October 1984) (Anderson, Squire, Rabin, White)
 "Yours Is No Disgrace" (dropped between 9 August 1984 and 1 October 1984) (Anderson, Squire, Howe, Kaye, Bruford)
 "Hold On" (Anderson, Rabin, Squire)
 "Perpetual Change" (dropped after 1 March 1984) (Anderson, Squire)
 "Hearts" (Anderson, Rabin, Kaye, White, Squire)
 "I've Seen All Good People" (Anderson, Squire)
 Kaye solo/"Si" (dropped between 29 August 1984 and 1 October 1984) (Kaye)
 "Solly's Beard" (Rabin)
 "Changes" (Rabin, Anderson, White)
 "And You and I" (Anderson, Squire, Howe, Bruford)
 "Soon"
 "Make It Easy" (Intro)/Owner of a Lonely Heart" (Rabin, Anderson, Squire, Horn)
 "It Can Happen" (Anderson, Squire, Rabin)
 "Long Distance Runaround" (dropped after 26 July 1984)
 "Whitefish/Amazing Grace" (Squire; traditional, arr. Squire)
 "City of Love" (Anderson, Rabin)
 "Starship Trooper" (Anderson, Squire, Howe)
 "Roundabout" (Anderson, Howe)
 "Gimme Some Lovin'" (added on from 9 August 1984) (Steve Winwood, Spencer Davis, Muff Winwood) (originally by The Spencer Davis Group in 1966)
Also occasionally played were:
 "Sweet Dreams" (Anderson, Foster) (Played on 5 March 1984 and 6 March 1984)
 "I'm Down" (Lennon-McCartney) (Played on 24 June 1984 and 1 September 1984)
 "Awaken" (Played on 9, 11 August 1984)
 "Whitefish" (Played on 14 March 1984, 11 May 1984, and 1 July 1984)
 "Ritual (Nous sommes du soleil) (Played on 7, 11, 12, 14 July 1984, and 21, 22 August 1984)

Big Generator Tour

Lineup:

 Jon Anderson – Vocals, additional keyboard and percussion
 Tony Kaye – Keyboards, vocals
 Trevor Rabin – Guitars, vocals
 Chris Squire – Bass, vocals
 Alan White – Drums, percussion, vocals

Setlist:

 "Almost Like Love" (dropped after 20 December 1987) (Kaye, Anderson, Rabin, Squire)
 "Rhythm of Love" (Kaye, Anderson, Rabin, Squire)
 "Hold On" (Anderson, Rabin, Squire)
 "Heart of the Sunrise" (Anderson, Squire, Bruford)
 "Changes" (Rabin, Anderson, White; Kaye, Squire)
 "Big Generator" (Anderson, Rabin, Kaye, White, Squire)
 "Shoot High, Aim Low" (Anderson, Rabin, Kaye, White, Squire)
 "Holy Lamb (Song for Harmonic Convergence)" (Anderson)
 Kaye solo (Kaye)
 "Solly's Beard" (Rabin)
 "Make it Easy" (Intro)/Owner of a Lonely Heart" (Rabin, Anderson, Squire, Horn)
 "Yours Is No Disgrace" (Anderson, Squire, Howe, Kaye, Bruford)
 "Ritual (Nous Sommes du Soleil") (Excerpt) (added on 7 December 1987, first played on 28 November 1987) (Anderson, Squire, Howe, Wakeman, White)
 "Amazing Grace" (traditional, arr. Squire)
 "And You and I" (Anderson, Squire, Howe, Bruford)
 "I'm Running" (dropped after 22 November 1987) (Anderson, Rabin, Kaye, White, Squire)
 "Würm" (the third section of "Starship Trooper") (Howe)
 "Love Will Find a Way" (Rabin)
 "I've Seen All Good People" (Anderson, Squire)
 "Roundabout" (Anderson, Howe)
Also played occasionally were:
 "Soon" (Anderson) (Played on 4, 5 April 1988)
 "On The Silent Wings of Freedom" (Anderson, Squire) (only the bass riff only on 19 November 1987)
 "Final Eyes" (Played on 14 November 1987, 19 November 1987, 21 November 1987, and 28 November 1987)
 "Donguri Koro Koro" (Played on 4, 5, 7, 9, 10, 12, 13 April 1988)

An Evening of Yes Music Plus Tour (ABWH)
This tour is documented on the live release: An Evening of Yes Music Plus.

Lineup:

 Jon Anderson – Vocals, percussion
 Bill Bruford – Drums, percussion
 Steve Howe – Guitars, vocals
 Rick Wakeman – Keyboards

plus:

 Julian Colbeck – Additional keyboards
 Tony Levin – Bass, vocals, Stick (replaced by Jeff Berlin 4–10 September 1989 due to illness)
 Milton McDonald – Additional guitars, vocals

Setlist:

 Medley
 "Time and a Word (Anderson, Foster)
 "Owner of a Lonely Heart" (Anderson, Horn, Rabin, Squire)
 "Teakbois: The Life and Time of Bobby Dread" (Anderson, Howe, Wakeman, Bruford)
 "Clap/Mood for a Day" (Howe)
 Wakeman solo (Wakeman)
 "Long Distance Runaround"/Bruford solo (Anderson; Bruford)
 "Birthright" (Anderson, Howe, Wakeman, Bruford, Max Bacon)
 "And You and I" (Anderson, Howe, Squire, Bruford)
 "I've Seen All Good People" (Anderson, Squire) (omitted on some dates in 1990)
 "Close to the Edge" (Anderson, Howe)
 "Themes" (Anderson, Howe, Wakeman, Bruford)
 Levin-Bruford duet (Bruford, Tony Levin)
 "Brother of Mine" (Anderson, Howe, Wakeman, Bruford, Downes)
 "The Meeting" (Anderson, Howe, Wakeman, Bruford)
 "Heart of the Sunrise" (Anderson, Squire, Bruford)
 "Order of the Universe" (Anderson, Howe, Wakeman, Bruford, Rhett Lawrence)
 "Roundabout" (Anderson, Howe)
 "Starship Trooper" (Anderson, Howe, Squire) (omitted on some dates in 1990)
 "Sweet Dreams" (Anderson, Foster) (only occasionally from 4 August 1989)
Other songs:
 "Let's Pretend" (Anderson, Howe, Wakeman, Bruford, Vangelis) (played on 29 July 1989)
 "Quartet" (Anderson, Howe, Wakeman, Bruford) (played on 29 July 1989)
 "Leaves of Green" (Anderson, Howe, Squire, Wakeman, White) (played on 29 July 1989)
 "Soon" (Anderson) (played on 29 October 1989)

Union Tour

Lineup:

 Jon Anderson – lead vocals
 Bill Bruford – electric + acoustic drums & percussions
 Steve Howe – acoustic & electric guitars, backing vocals
 Tony Kaye – Hammond organ, synthesizers
 Trevor Rabin – electric guitars, lead & backing vocals
 Chris Squire – bass guitar, pedals, backing vocals
 Rick Wakeman – electric piano, synthesizers, keytar
 Alan White – acoustic drums & percussion

Setlist:

 "Yours Is No Disgrace" (Anderson, Squire, Howe, Kaye, Bruford)
 "Rhythm of Love" (Kaye, Anderson, Rabin, Squire)
 "Shock to the System" (Anderson, Howe, Jonathan Elias)
 "City of Love" (Rabin, Anderson) (Dropped after 9 April 1991)
 "Heart of the Sunrise" (Anderson, Squire, Bruford)
 Steve Howe solo section (Howe)
 "Make it Easy" (Intro)/Owner of a Lonely Heart" (Anderson, Rabin, Horn, Squire)
 "And You and I" (Anderson, Squire, Howe, Bruford)
 Drum duet (Bruford, White)
 "Hold On" (dropped after 13 June 1991) (Rabin, Anderson, Squire) 
 Kaye solo (only between 12 April 1991 and 22 June 1991) (Kaye)
 "Changes" (Anderson, Rabin, White)
 "I've Seen All Good People" (added on from 19 April 1991) (Anderson, Squire)
 "Solly's Beard" (Rabin)
 "Take the Water to the Mountain" (Anderson) (Dropped after opening night)
 "Soon" (Anderson) (Dropped after opening night)
 "Long Distance Runaround" (replaced by "Saving My Heart" starting 12 July 1991) (Anderson; Rabin)
 "Whitefish/Amazing Grace" (Squire, White; traditional, arr. Squire)
 "Lift Me Up" (Rabin, Squire)
 Wakeman solo (Wakeman)
 "Awaken" (Anderson, Howe)
 "Roundabout" (Anderson, Howe)
 "Starship Trooper" (dropped after 17 April 1991) (Anderson, Squire, Howe)
Also played occasionally were:
 "Close to the Edge" (Anderson, Howe) (Played on 14 July 1991 without Trevor Rabin, Tony Kaye, or Alan White)
 "Gimme Some Lovin'" (Winwood, Davis, Winwood) (Played on 24 April 1991)

Talk Tour

This was the last tour to feature Trevor Rabin and Tony Kaye as members of Yes.

Touring Personnel:

Band
 Jon Anderson – Vocals, percussion, keyboards
 Tony Kaye – Keyboards
 Trevor Rabin – Guitars, keyboards, vocals
 Chris Squire – Bass guitar, vocals
 Alan White – Drums, percussion

with

 Billy Sherwood – Guitars, keyboards, bass guitar, vocals

Tour Management
Chris Pollan - Tour Manager
Peter Mackay - Assistant Tour Manager
Graham "Grim Reaper" Holmes - Production Manager
Mark Reinke - Stage Manager
Karen Holmes - Production Assistant
Jonathan Smeeton - Lighting/Set Designer
Butch Allen - Lighting Director

Band Crew
Jimmy Robison - Drum Tech
Robbie Eagle - Keyboard Tech
Paul Linford - Guitar Tech
Richard Davis - Bass Tech 
John Laraio - Jon Anderson Tech

Sound Crew
Dave Natale - House Engineer
Dave Skaff - Monitor Engineer
Bart Adams - Sound Tech
Kirk Shriener - Sound Tech 
Chad Shreiner - Sound Tech

Lighting Crew
Bill Conte - Lighting Crew Head
Sam Deleo - Vari*Lite Operator
Gregg Kocurek - Vari*Lite Technician
Ian England - Lighting Tech
Garry Waldie - Lighting Tech 
Peter Moore - Roboscan Programmer

Setlist:

 "Perpetual Change" (Anderson, Squire)
 "The Calling" (Rabin, Anderson, Squire)
 "I Am Waiting" (Rabin, Anderson)
 "Rhythm of Love" (Kaye, Rabin, Anderson, Squire)
 "Hearts" (dropped after 30 September 1994) (Anderson, Rabin, Kaye, Squire, White)
 "Real Love" (Rabin, Anderson, Squire)
 "Changes" (Anderson, Rabin, White)
 "Heart of the Sunrise" (Anderson, Squire, Bruford)
 "Cinema" (dropped after 16 August 1994) (Squire, Rabin, White, Kaye)
 "City of Love" (dropped after 16 August 1994) (Rabin, Anderson)
 "Make it Easy" (Intro)/Owner of a Lonely Heart" (Anderson, Rabin, Squire, Horn)
 "Where Will You Be" (Dropped after 26 August 1994) (Rabin, Anderson)
 Trevor Rabin's Keyboard solo/"And You and I" (Rabin; Anderson, Squire, Howe, Bruford)
 "I've Seen All Good People" (Anderson, Squire)
 "Walls" (Anderson, Rabin, Roger Hodgson)
 "Endless Dream" (Rabin, Anderson)
 "Hold On" (only between 25 June 1994 and 26 July 1994) (Anderson, Rabin, Squire) 
 "Roundabout" (Anderson, Howe)
 "Purple Haze" (added on from 13 August 1994) (Jimi Hendrix) (originally by Hendrix in 1967)
"Yours Is No Disgrace" was played on the last night of the tour.

San Luis Obispo shows (Keys to Ascension Tour) 
These were the first shows to feature Steve Howe and Rick Wakeman since the Union tour. Wakeman played all three shows, but subsequently left the band, later re-joining in 2002. Since these shows, Howe has to this day been performing with the group.

Lineup:

 Jon Anderson – Vocals
 Steve Howe – Guitars, vocals
 Chris Squire – Bass, vocals
 Rick Wakeman – Keyboards
 Alan White – Drums, percussion

Setlist:

 "Siberian Khatru" (Anderson, Howe, Wakeman)
 "Close to the Edge" (Anderson, Howe)
 "I've Seen All Good People" (Anderson, Squire)
 "Time and a Word" (Anderson, Foster)
 "And You and I" (Anderson, Squire, Howe, Bruford)
 "The Revealing Science of God (Dance of the Dawn)" (Anderson, Squire, Howe, Wakeman, White) 
 "Going for the One" 
 "Turn of the Century" (Anderson, Howe, White)
 "Happy Birthday to You (Chris Squire)" (Only on 4 March 1996)
 "America" (Simon)
 "Onward" (Squire)
 "Awaken" (Anderson, Howe)
 "Roundabout" (Anderson, Howe)
 "Starship Trooper" (Anderson, Squire, Howe)

Cancelled Know Tour

This tour was entirely cancelled due to Wakeman's sudden departure.

Open Your Eyes and 30th Anniversary Tour

Lineup:

 Jon Anderson – Vocals
 Steve Howe – Guitars, vocals
 Billy Sherwood – Guitars, vocals
 Chris Squire – Bass, vocals
 Alan White – Drums, percussion

plus:

 Igor Khoroshev – Keyboards, vocals

Setlist:

 "Siberian Khatru"
 "Rhythm of Love" (Kaye, Rabin, Anderson, Squire)
 "America" (Simon) (Dropped after 9 July 1998)
 "Open Your Eyes" (Anderson, Squire, Howe, White, Billy Sherwood)
 "And You and I" (Anderson, Squire, Howe, Bruford)
 "Heart of the Sunrise" (Anderson, Squire, Bruford)
 "Steve Howe solo section" (Howe)
 "Leaves of Green" (Anderson, Squire, Howe, Wakeman, White) (Dropped after 2 December 1997)
 "From the Balcony" (Anderson, Squire, Howe, White, Sherwood) (between 5 December 1997 and 24 April 1998)
 Khoroshev keyboard solo (dropped after 5 July 1998) (Igor Khoroshev)
 "Children of Light" (Anderson, Howe, Squire, Vangelis, Wakeman; Anderson) (replaced by "Wonderous Stories" starting 1 March 1998)
 "Long Distance Runaround"
 "Whitefish/Ritual (Nous sommes du Soleil)" (Excerpt) (Anderson, Squire, Howe, Wakeman, White)
 "Owner of a Lonely Heart" (Anderson, Rabin, Squire, Horn)
 "Soon" (Anderson) (Dropped after 22 November 1997)
 "The Revealing Science of God (Dance of the Dawn)" (Dropped after 24 April 1998, replaced by "Close to the Edge" from 18 June 1998)
 "I've Seen All Good People" (Anderson, Squire)
 "Roundabout" (Anderson, Howe)
 "Starship Trooper" (Anderson, Squire, Howe/Anderson, Squire, Howe, Kaye, Bruford) (replaced by "Yours Is No Disgrace" from 18 June 1998) 
Also occasionally played were:
 "No Way We Can Lose" (Anderson, Squire, Howe, White, Sherwood) (Played on 17 October 1997 and 24 July 1998)
 "Ritual (Nous Sommes du Soleil)" (Anderson, Squire, Howe, Wakeman, White) (Played on 6 March 1998, 7 April 1998, 19 June 1998, 20 June 1998, and 23 June 1998)
 "Memphis, Tennessee" (Chuck Berry) (originally by Berry in 1959) (Played on 4 August 1998)

The Ladder Tour

Lineup:

 Jon Anderson – Vocals
 Steve Howe – Guitars, vocals
 Billy Sherwood – Guitar, vocals
 Igor Khoroshev – Keyboards, vocals
 Chris Squire – Bass, vocals
 Alan White – Drums, percussion

Setlist:

 "Yours Is No Disgrace" (Anderson, Squire, Howe, Kaye, Bruford)
 "America" (Simon) (Dropped after 24 September 1999)
 "Time and a Word" (excerpt) (Anderson, Foster)
 "Homeworld (The Ladder)" (Anderson, Squire, Howe, White, Sherwood, Khoroshev)
 "Perpetual Change" (Anderson, Squire)
 "Lightning Strikes" (Anderson, Squire, Howe, White, Sherwood, Khoroshev)
 "New Language" (Anderson, Squire, Howe, White, Sherwood, Khoroshev) (replaced by "The Messenger" starting 23 October 1999) 
 "Ritual (Nous Sommes du Soleil)" (excerpt) (Anderson, Squire, Howe, Wakeman, White)
 "And You and I" (Anderson, Squire, Howe, Bruford) (Added on 16 September 1999)
 "It Will Be a Good Day (The River)" (Anderson, Squire, Howe, White, Sherwood, Khoroshev)
 "Face to Face" (Anderson, Squire, Howe, White, Sherwood, Khoroshev) (added on 15 October 1999)
 "Hearts" (Anderson, Rabin, Kaye, Squire, White) (Dropped after 4 March 2000)
 "Nine Voices (Longwalker)" (Anderson, Squire, Howe, White, Sherwood, Khoroshev) (dropped after 9 November 1999)
 "Awaken" (Anderson, Howe) (Added on 15 October 1999)
 "To Be Alive (Hep Yadda)" (Anderson, Squire, Howe, White, Sherwood, Khoroshev) (dropped after 12 September 1999)
 "I've Seen All Good People" (Anderson, Squire)
 Steve Howe solo section (Howe)
 "Cinema" (Rabin, Squire, White, Kaye) (Added on 15 October 1999)
 "Owner of a Lonely Heart" (Anderson, Rabin, Squire, Horn)
 "Roundabout" (Anderson, Howe)
Also occasionally played were:
 "Close to the Edge" (Anderson, Howe) (Played on 18, 21, 22, 24 September 1999 and 29, 30, 31 October 1999)
 "Leaves of Green" (Anderson, Squire, Howe, Wakeman, White) (Played on 15 October 1999 and 19 October 1999)
 "Long Distance Runaround" (Anderson) (Played on 6, 16, 18, 21, and 22 September 1999 and 23, 25 March 2000)
 "Soon" (Anderson) (Played on 6 September 1999)
 "Survival" (Played on 12 September 1999)

Notes

References

External links
Yesworld: The Official Yes website Past & present versions
Forgotten Yesterdays (A Comprehensive Guide To Yes Shows)

1980s
1980s-related lists
1990s-related lists
Yes